Elina L'vovna Karokhina (Элина Львовна Карохина)  (born April 26, 1973 in Leningrad (now Saint Petersburg), Russia) is a balalaika player currently residing in Cliffside Park, New Jersey.

She is the daughter of the 2003 Pushkin Prize-winning author and jazz (saxophone) musician L'ev Fyodorovich Karokhin and Galina (Savich) Karokhina.  She began her formal training at the Mussorgsky Music College of Saint Petersburg and continued her training at N.A. Rimsky-Korsakov Saint Petersburg State Conservatory, earning a degree as an Orchestra Soloist.

She continued her training at the Conservatory, which included a number of concerts in Germany to fulfill the obligations of her scholarship. She completed her education in Saint Petersburg; earning a Doctor of Musical Art degree in the balalaika. Following her graduation, she began working as a musician, both as a performer and a teacher of balalaika, mandolin, and piano.

Elina is a Musician Laureate of the international folk instrument performers’ competition 'Troyanovski'. She was a diploma winner at the 1997 'Cup of the North' competition held in Cherepovets, Russia.  

Elina served in the Russian Army in the Military Ensemble in the Northwest Order of Red Stars and her unit received honors in competitions across Russia.   As a member of a quartet within the military orchestra, Elina has performed private performances for Russian generals.   

She was a member of the band for the Moscow Circus, “Smirnov’s Folk Trio” with Rudolf Smirnov and Maxim "Max" Anukhin and also performed with Rudolf and Max as a member of the Russian folk group "Izba Trio" before emigrating to the United States in October 2010. She is currently the balalaika player for Mikhail "Misha" Smirnov's troupe "Barynya Ensemble", which is based in New Jersey.

Recording credits 

 
With Anthony Thistlethwaite (formerly of “The Waterboys")-  “All The Way” and “Welcome to the White Nights” on the album Crawfish and Caviar, recorded 10/95  (Demon Records) in Saint Petersburg, Russia, with special guest Mick Taylor, formerly of the Rolling Stones.
 {page 19}

 Izba Trio-  self-titled CD, 2007
 Russian Army Orchestra Order of the Northwest Red Stars- “Songs of Russian Heroic Fame”    credit page
 Kupola Folk Ensemble-  self-titled CD (Elina pictured on top/right)
 State Russian Concert Orchestra of St. Petersburg- self-titled CD,    2003
 Nadir Mamedoff- “My Russia”,   toured/recorded CD as a member of his backing musical trio “Troyka”.  (Elina pictured in lower left)

1973 births
Living people
Russian balalaika players
Russian women musicians
Russian musicians
Saint Petersburg Conservatory alumni
21st-century women musicians